The Public Administration School of Catalonia is a public organisation, founded in 1912 by Enric Prat de la Riba, currently falls under the Ministry of Governance and Public Administration of the Generalitat of Catalonia. At that time, it was the second European school dedicated to research and training in the field of public administration. The first one was settled in Düsseldorf.

Practical and professional training was the main objective for Regenerationism of that time, as well as knowledge in legal and administrative affairs. It was necessary to get public servants trained in all professional fields and adapt the educational system to the new productive needs of the Catalan industrial process and the new local policy, as a means to achieve the cohesion of the Catalan territory.

History 
In the first report on the proposal for the creation of the Commonwealth of Catalonia, the convenience of creating a school of civil servants was advocated to provided them with basic knowledge on administrative law and accountability for municipalities. This was reflected in the functioning of the public administrations of the industrialized countries of Europe. In parallel to the training given at the School from 1914, whose director was Isidre Lloret i Massaguer, civil servant of Barcelona City Council and professor of municipal law, the School organized the "municipal weeks", which were celebrated every year and important issues for the councils were discussed.

In 1924 - under the name of School of Administration - it was closed by the dictatorship of Primo de Rivera and was reopened in 1930 under the name of Public Administration School. Once the Republican Generalitat was established, and until 1939, it became the Public Administration School of the Generalitat of Catalonia.

In 1979, the institution was restored under the current name. Nowadays, its strategic guidelines are:
 Implement a model geared towards the academic, political, administrative, and humanist training of the Catalan public Administration’s personnel.
 Adapt the services and resources, addressed to all personnel in the Catalan public Administration, to the political and social demands and requirements of the 21st century.
 Place the School among the main international benchmarks in the continued training of leaders and managers in the public sector.
 Strengthen the School’s relationship with the Catalan university system and with similar international centres through active cooperation and collaboration in the areas of public sector training and research.
In 2012, the School was rewarded with the St. George's Cross.

Directors 
 Isidre Lloret i Massaguer, 1914-1922
 Ramon Coll i Rodés, 1923-1924
 [The School was suspended for the dictatorship of Primo de Rivera]
 Ramon Coll i Rodés, 1930-1936
 Frederic Culí i Verdaguer, 1936
 Josep Xirau i Palau, 1937-1938?
 [The School was suspended for the dictatorship of Franco]
 Josep Maria Vallès i Casadevall, 1979-1980
 Martí Pagonabarraga i Garro, 1980-1980 (acting)
 Josep-Enric Rebés i Solé, 1980-1989
 Eduard Sànchez i Monjo, 1989-1989 (acting)
 Joaquim Ferret i Jacas, 1989-1996
 Simó Aliana i Magrí, 1996-1999
 Josep Maria Guinart i Solà, 2000-2003
 Maria Teresa Martí i Castro, 2003-2004 (acting)
 Rut Carandell i Rieradevall, 2004-2006
 Juli Ponce i Solé, 2006
 Maria Teresa Aragonès i Perales, 2006-2007 (acting)
 Carles Ramió i Matas, 2007-2011
 Montserrat de Vehí i Torra, 2011-2015
 Meritxell Masó i Carbó,  2015-2016 (acting)
 Agustí Colomines i Companys, 2016-2018
 Meritxell Masó i Carbó,  2018 (acting)
 Xavier Gatius i Garriga, 2018-2020 (acting)
 Marta Felip i Torres, 2020-2021
 Ismael Peña-López, 2021-present

References 

Government of Catalonia